Mills Rocks is a  biological Site of Special Scientific Interest south-east of East Grinstead in West Sussex.

This site has rock outcrops with a number of rare plants, such as reed fescue grass at one of its only two locations in southern England. The rocks also support a rich variety of mosses and liverworts. There are also areas of woodland, bracken and bramble.

The site is private land but a public footpath runs through it.

References

Sites of Special Scientific Interest in West Sussex
Hartfield